Juan Carlos Silva Maya (born 6 February 1988) is a Mexican professional footballer who plays as a midfielder.

He made his league debut for America on 12 August 2007 against Chiapas in a 6–1 victory at the Estadio Azteca.

Silva has represented his country in international competition, competing for Mexico U-17 squad in the 2005 U-17 FIFA World Cup, which Mexico won.

Assault
In February 2010 he was shot in the buttocks during an attempted robbery in Mexico City, only a week after his teammate Salvador Cabañas was shot in the head in a bar.

Honours
Mexico U17
FIFA U-17 World Championship: 2005

References

External links

1988 births
Living people
Mexico under-20 international footballers
Mexico youth international footballers
Liga MX players
Club América footballers
Club Necaxa footballers
C.F. Pachuca players
San Luis F.C. players
Footballers from Mexico City
Mexican footballers
Mexican expatriate footballers
Expatriate footballers in Guatemala
Mexican expatriate sportspeople in Guatemala
Xelajú MC players
Association football midfielders
Deportivo Sanarate F.C. players